Lake Owassa (formerly Long Pond) is a  freshwater lake within the watershed of the Paulins Kill located in Frankford Township in Sussex County, New Jersey. It is fed from runoff from Kittatinny Mountain along its western flank and by Bear Swamp. Water from Lake Owassa feeds into nearby Culver's Lake (formerly Round Pond) before flowing into the West Branch of the Paulins Kill.

While the name Owassa implies an origin from Native American languages, it is not derived from the Unami or Munsee dialects of the Lenape who resided in New Jersey.  Conversely, the name was derived from the fabricated name of a fictional Indian character in a long poem written by a local clergyman, George William Lloyd (1821–1906) in Branchville, New Jersey for his deceased wife, Sarah Prince Lloyd (1819–1890).

References

External links

 http://www.lakeowassa.org/

Owassa
Owassa
Paulins Kill watershed
Frankford Township, New Jersey